The 2021 Winnipeg Blue Bombers season was the 63rd season for the team in the Canadian Football League (CFL) and their 88th season overall. The Blue Bombers entered the season as the defending Grey Cup champions for the first time in 30 years, having ended the franchise's lengthy drought with last year's championship win in the 107th Grey Cup game. The Blue Bombers qualified for the playoffs for the fifth consecutive season following a victory over the Edmonton Elks on October 16, 2021. The team won their first division title since 2011, and first west division title since 1972, after they defeated the BC Lions on October 23, 2021.

The Blue Bombers won the 12th Grey Cup championship in franchise history following their 33–25 overtime victory over the Hamilton Tiger-Cats in the 108th Grey Cup game.

This was the seventh season under head coach Mike O'Shea and the seventh full season under general manager Kyle Walters.

An 18-game season schedule was originally released on November 20, 2020, but it was announced on April 21, 2021 that the start of the season would likely be delayed until August and feature a 14-game schedule. On June 15, 2021, the league released the revised 14-game schedule with regular season play beginning on August 5, 2021.

Offseason

CFL Global Draft
The 2021 CFL Global Draft took place on April 15, 2021. With the format being a snake draft, the Blue Bombers selected fourth in the odd-numbered rounds and sixth in the even-numbered rounds.

CFL National Draft
The 2021 CFL Draft took place on May 4, 2021. The Blue Bombers had six selections in the six-round snake draft and had the third pick in odd rounds and the seventh pick in even rounds.

Preseason
Due to the shortening of the season, the CFL confirmed that pre-season games would not be played in 2021.

Planned schedule

Regular season

Standings

Schedule
The Blue Bombers initially had a schedule that featured 18 regular season games beginning on June 10 and ending on October 30. However, due to the COVID-19 pandemic in Canada, the Canadian Football League delayed the start of the regular season to August 5, 2021 and the Blue Bombers began their 14-game season that same day.

Post-season

Schedule

Team

Roster

Coaching staff

References

Winnipeg Blue Bombers seasons
2021 Canadian Football League season by team
2021 in Manitoba
Grey Cup championship seasons